Iacopo II Appiani (1400 – 27 December 1441) was the lord of Piombino from 1411 until 1427.

He was born in Piombino, the son of Gherardo Appiano, whom he succeeded in 1411, remaining under the regency of his mother Paola Colonna until coming of age. He is described as a cruel man, switching abruptly his alliances from the Republic of Florence to that of Siena, and then moving again to the former. He strengthened his position by marrying Donella Fieschi, daughter of the powerful Genoese patrician and Florentine commander Gian Luigi Fieschi.

Iacopo died childless in 1427, perhaps poisoned, and was succeeded by his mother.

References

1400 births
1441 deaths
Iacopo 2
People from Piombino
Iacopo 2